Hvassaleitisskóli (also known colloquially as Hvassó) was an Icelandic elementary school located at Hvassaleiti in Reykjavík.  The school was founded in 1966 and had around 240 students, 32 teachers and 6 other workers. It was merged with Álftamýrarskóli to form Háaleitiskóli.

External links
The official homepage of Hvassaleitisskóli

Schools in Iceland
Educational institutions established in 1966
Education in Reykjavík
1966 establishments in Iceland